R.G. Barry Corporation, stylized RG Barry, is a developer and marketer of footwear, handbags, and foot care products. It was founded by Florence Melton, Aaron Zacks, and Harry Streim in 1947 in Columbus, Ohio. It is known for its Dearfoams slippers and Baggallini handbags brands. It is headquartered in Pickerington, Ohio.

History 
In 1945, Florence Melton had developed a removable shoulder pad for women's military-style fashions of the time. She, her husband Aaron Zacks, and businessman Harry Streim started a business called Shoulda-Moulders Co, and worked on developing slippers, bathrobes, and pillows.  In 1947, Florence Melton visited the Firestone Tire and Rubber Co. in Akron, OH, to research new materials for her shoulder pads. There, she found foam latex, a material that was developed during WWII. Florence decided that the material would be best used in footwear, not shoulder pads, and she created her first slipper prototype. In 1947, the company was renamed to R.G. Barry, which was named after their children: Richard Streim, Gordon Zacks and Barry Zacks. In 1948, Dearfoams introduces the world's first foam-cushioned, washable slipper. It is an immediate hit in the notions area of department stores. In 1949, R.G. Barry released Angel Treads, the first foam-cushioned, washable slipper, as one of their featured products. The Dearfoams slipper brand was introduced in 1958. Following the launch of Dearfoams, R.G. Barry added operations in Puerto Rico, Tennessee, Texas, North Carolina, and New York, in an effort to boost company business.

R.G. Barry went public in 1962, and was listed on the American Stock Exchange. In 1965, Gordon Zacks became the company president, In 1974, they sold the Mushrooms brand sandals and footwear. They were the subject of a trademark lawsuit with Mushroom Makers, which sold women's sportswear. Sales of Mushrooms were reported to have peaked at $120 million in 1978. The company would later sell the Mushroom brand to United States Shoe Corporation in 1982.

In 1979, Gordon Zacks became Chairman of the Board and CEO, and the company's net sales topped $100 million for the first time. Following a reorganization effort in the 1980s, Dearfoams launched a line of men's slippers and redesigned its women's line with an emphasis on “giftability”  Dearfoams Warm-Up Boots become one of the top-selling holiday gift items in U.S. department store history. R.G. Barry also broadened its retail distribution, branching out from department stores to mass merchandisers like Kmart and Wal-Mart. In 1997, Dearfoams celebrates its 50th anniversary and is named Wal-Mart Stores International Soft Lines Vendor of the Year.  The company launched a series of television commercials promoting Dearfoams. In 2004, Zacks stepped down from his position due to disappointing sales. The company had also closed its plants in Mexico. Thomas von Lehman served as the interim CEO, and in 2006, Greg Tunney, formerly with Phoenix Footwear, became the new CEO. In February 2008, the company switched its listings from American Stock Exchange to NASDAQ.

In January 2011, R.G. Barry acquired the Foot Petals brand, from a Long Beach-based insole maker . The company was founded by Tina Aldatz in 2001 with products for high heels wearers, and has since expanded to various footwear. In 2020, Remington Products (now known as Foundation Wellness) acquired Foot Petals.

In March 2011, R.G. Barry acquired the Baggallini brand, from a maker of handbags and travel accessories, in a $33.8 million deal. Baggallini was started by two Delta Airlines flight attendants Dixie Powers and Ann Simmons in 1996 when they were selling currency bags to airline employees in airport lounges. 

On September 3, 2014, R.G. Barry was taken private by Mill Road Capital and The Blackstone Group. In November 2017, Greg Tunney stepped down as CEO. Bob Mullaney, former COO of Shoes.com was named the CEO in December 2017. In 2017, the Pickerington City Council voted to help fund an upgrade to the company in order for it to keep its presence in the city and grow its employee base from 100 to 120 jobs.

During the 2019 holiday season, Dearfoams launched its first commercial in nearly a decade,"Together In Dearfoams" , featuring its popular limited-edition matching family slippers. In Holiday 2020, Dearfoams partnered with Lacey Chabert to introduce its 2020 limited edition matching family styles and marketing campaign, centered around "The Family You Choose" Sweepstakes, in which each winner (8 total) was able to donate $1,000 back to their local community food bank and Dearfoams donated $2,000 to its local food bank, Mid-Ohio Food Collective. In 2021, Dearfoams ranked #1 in The Sustainability Consortium – 3 year in a row.

References

External links 
 RG Barry Corporation Official Website
 Dearfoams Official Website
Dearfoams Official Instagram
baggallini Official Website
baggallini Official Instagram

Clothing companies of the United States
Clothing companies established in 1947
Companies based in Ohio
1947 establishments in Ohio